Kittredge may refer to:

 Kittredge (name)
 Kittredge (grape), hybrid wine grape that is also known as Ives noir

Places
 Kittredge, Colorado, census-designated place in Jefferson County, Colorado
 Kittredge Mansion, historic house in North Andover, Massachusetts
 Alvah Kittredge House, historic house in Boston, Massachusetts

See also 
 Kit Kittredge: An American Girl, 2008 American comedy-drama film